A dustpan, the small version of which is also known as a "hearth brush and shovel” (from its use of cleaning the fireplace hearth), is a cleaning utensil. The dustpan is commonly used in combination with a broom or long brush. The small dustpan may appear to be a type of flat scoop. Though often hand-held for home use, industrial and commercial enterprises use a hinged variety on the end of a stick to allow the user to stand instead of stoop while using it. The first patented dustpan was by T.E. McNeill.

Handheld dustpans may be used with either a full-size broom or with a smaller broom or a brush. This second combination may be sold as one unit. A variant on the dustpan is the silent butler, a handheld, lidded dustpan.

Gallery 

Cleaning tools
Mechanical hand tools